The Union Dutchmen and Dutchwomen comprise the 24 teams representing Union College in intercollegiate athletics, including men and women's basketball, crew, cross country, ice hockey, lacrosse, soccer, swimming & diving, tennis, and track and field. Men's only sports include baseball and football. Women's only sports include field hockey, golf, softball, and volleyball.

Leagues
The Dutchmen compete in the NCAA Division III and are members of the Liberty League for all sports except ice hockey, which competes in NCAA Division I as a member of ECAC Hockey.

Teams

Notable athletes
Jake Fishman (born 1995), Major League Baseball pitcher for the Miami Marlins, and Olympian for Team Israel
Shayne Gostisbehere (born 1993), NHL player
Ashley Johnston (born 1992), NWHL player
Keith Kinkaid (born 1989), NHL player

See also
 Collegiate sports
 NCAA

References

External links
 

 

de:Union_College#Sport
fr:Dutchmen d'Union
sv:Union Dutchmen/Dutchwomen